Hamm (Sieg) is a Verbandsgemeinde ("collective municipality") in the district of Altenkirchen, in Rhineland-Palatinate, Germany. The seat of the Verbandsgemeinde is in Hamm (Sieg).

Geography
The Verbandsgemeinde Hamm (Sieg) is located in the northwestern part of the district of Altenkirchen. It borders the municipalities Windeck and Morsbach in its west and north and the Verbandsgemeinden Altenkirchen and Wissen in its south and east.

Subdivisions

The Verbandsgemeinde Hamm (Sieg) consists of the following Ortsgemeinden ("local municipalities"):

¹ seat of the Verbandsgemeinde

Population development
Development of the population in the region, that is Hamm (Sieg) today:

¹ Census results

Politics

Verbandsgemeinde council
The council of the Verbandsgemeinde Hamm (Sieg) consists of 28 voluntary members. Its chairman is the Bürgermeister.

Coat of arms
The blazon of the coat of arms of Hamm (Sieg) is:

Election districts
In state elections Verbandsgemeinde Hamm (Sieg) is part of electoral district 02-Altenkirchen, in federal elections it's part of electoral district 198-Neuwied.

References

Verbandsgemeinde in Rhineland-Palatinate